Lucas Lima may refer to:

Lucas Lima (footballer, born 1990), born Lucas Rafael Araújo Lima, Brazilian football attacking midfielder for Palmeiras
Lucas Lima (footballer, born 1991), born Lucas Pedro Alves de Lima, Brazilian football left-back
Lucas Lima (footballer, born 2000), born Lucas Eduardo Lima da Silva, Brazilian football midfielder

See also
Lucas Paquetá (Lucas Tolentino Coelho de Lima, born 1997), Brazilian football attacking midfielder for Lyon